American Giant is a San Francisco–based manufacturer of sportswear and casual clothing that sells directly to customers through its website. Its goods are all produced in the United States.

History
American Giant was founded in February 2012 by Bayard Winthrop, former head of Chrome Industries, to address what he saw as a lack of affordably priced high-quality American-made products. He believed that by selling direct to the customer, a business could save enough on distribution and marketing to sell at mainstream prices products manufactured in America. The company was named one of the 50 Most Innovative Companies by Fast Company in 2015 and cited for "breathing new life into U.S. apparel manufacturing". Initially, the company's products were all made at a factory in Brisbane, California.

The company launched with one product, a hooded sweatshirt. After a viral video and favorable publicity (a review in Slate called it "the greatest hoodie ever made"), demand outstripped the factory's capacity, and unable to find other sites that satisfied his standards, Winthrop chose to let orders back up rather than compromise on quality. , the company was manufacturing its clothing in Los Angeles and in Middlesex, North Carolina.

American Giant's main initial investor was former PepsiCo CEO and chairman Donald M. Kendall. Later investors included Emil Capital Partners, a venture capital firm. , the company had raised $5.6 million and had begun a round of financing with a target of $12 million.

With Randy Komisar, Winthrop published I F*cking Love That Company (2014), a book about direct to consumer retail.

Products
American Giant launched with its Classic Full Zip hooded sweatshirt, which was created by Philipe Manoux, a former industrial engineer at Apple. Using cotton grown in North Carolina, it is constructed of a heavyweight, 12.4 oz fleece and features reinforced elbow pads, a double-lined hood, custom hardware, a side-panel for mobility, and spandex woven into the cuffs and waist to hold shape and elasticity.

The product line has since expanded to include other kinds of men's sweatshirts, tee-shirts, and sweatpants, and subsequently women's sportswear and jeans. In 2018, the company began selling yarn-dyed flannel shirts.

References

Clothing companies established in 2012
Clothing companies of the United States
Clothing manufacturers
Manufacturing companies based in San Francisco